K.Paramathy block is a revenue block in the Karur district of Tamil Nadu, India. It has a total of 30 panchayat villages. K.Paramathi is a town in K.Paramathy Block. It is located 22 km towards west from District headquarters Karur. It is the Block headquarters.

Transport
Karur Junction is major railway station  from K. Paramathi.

References
 

Revenue blocks of Karur district